Hedhe Halls Rocha da Silva (born 17 June 1999), commonly known as Hedhe Halls, is a Brazilian footballer who plays  as a goalkeeper for Vasco da Gama.

Personal life
Halls' younger brother, named Henrique and also known as Halls, is also a footballer. A central defender, he plays for Red Bull Bragantino.

Career statistics

Club

References

1999 births
Living people
Brazilian footballers
Association football goalkeepers
CR Vasco da Gama players
Clube Náutico Capibaribe players
Boa Esporte Clube players
Campeonato Brasileiro Série B players
People from Nova Iguaçu
Sportspeople from Rio de Janeiro (state)